The Cole River is located in Bristol County, Massachusetts. It flows  from its headwaters in Dighton, Massachusetts through the towns of Rehoboth and Swansea into Mount Hope Bay, an arm of Narragansett Bay. The Cole River becomes tidal after crossing under the G.A.R. Highway (U.S. Route 6) in Swansea.

Named tributaries
Cole Brook (from Rehoboth, Massachusetts)

Crossings
in Dighton, Massachusetts:
Wellington Street
Cedar Street

in Swansea, Massachusetts:
Lewis Street
Baker Street
Hortonville Road
Wood Street
Milford Street
G.A.R. Highway (U.S. Route 6)
Interstate 195
Route 103

See also
Coles Brook, a short stream in nearby Seekonk, Massachusetts
Ocean Grove, Massachusetts

References

Rivers of Massachusetts